Prokaryotic transcription could mean:

Bacterial transcription
Archaeal transcription